McKelvie is a surname. Notable people with the surname include:

Chris McKelvie (born 1985), American ice hockey player
Christina McKelvie (born 1968), Scottish politician
Danny McKelvie, Scottish rugby league player
Danny McKelvie (footballer) (born 1980), Scottish footballer
Ian McKelvie, New Zealand politician
Jamie McKelvie (born 1980), British cartoonist and illustrator
Red McKelvie, New Zealand musician
Robert McKelvie (1912–1996), English cricketer
Roderick R. McKelvie (born 1946), American judge
Samuel Roy McKelvie (1881–1956), American politician
Susan McKelvie (born 1985), Scottish hammer thrower

See also
Mount McKelvie, a mountain of Canada
Samuel R. McKelvie National Forest, a forest in Nebraska, United States